An overview of the films produced by the Bollywood film industry based in Mumbai in 1953.

Do Bigha Zameen directed and produced by Bengali director Bimal Roy and starring Balraj Sahni, Nirupa Roy, Ratan Kumar and Jagdeep won the Filmfare Best Movie Award. Bimal Roy also won the Filmfare Best Director Award and the film won the Certificate of Merit at National Film Award of India.
Roy would win the Filmfare Best Director in 1955 also for the film Parineeta in which actress Meena Kumari scooped the Filmfare Best Actress Award for her performance.

Highest-grossing films
The ten highest-grossing films at the Indian Box Office in 1953:

A–B

C–F

G–L

M–P

R–Z

References

External links
 Bollywood films of 1953 at the Internet Movie Database
 Indian Film Songs from the Year 1953 - A look back at the year 1953 with a special focus on Hindi film songs

1953
Bollywood
Films, Bollywood